Hemitoxin (HTX; α-KTx6.15) is a 35-mer basic peptide from the venom of the Iranian scorpion Hemiscorpius lepturus, which reversibly blocks Kv1.1, Kv1.2 and Kv1.3 voltage-gated K+ channels.

Sources

HTX is a neurotoxin derived from the venom of the scorpion Hemiscorpius lepturus, which is found in the southwest province of Iran, Khuzestan. Hemitoxin constitutes about 0.1% of all venom proteins found in the Hemiscorpius lepturus venom gland.

Chemistry

HTX is a peptide composed of 35 amino acids including eight cysteine residues which are cross linked forming four intramolecular cystine amino acids via disulfide bridges. It belongs to subfamily 6 of the α-KTx family of potassium channel scorpion toxins and has the highest sequence similarity with Maurotoxin (MTX), which is derived from a Tunisian scorpion called Scorpio maurus palmatus. MTX is also a K+ channel blocker but is composed of 34 amino acids instead of 35.

Target

HTX is a voltage-gated K+ channel blocker peptide. It reversibly blocks type Kv1.1, Kv1.2 and Kv1.3 channels with IC50 values of 13, 16 and 2 nM, respectively. HTX has a different affinity for K+ channels. It appears to be 20 times less potent on Kv1.2 channels and 90 times more potent on Kv1.3 channels than the α-KTx6 family member MTX.

Mode of Action

HTX causes reversible current inhibition on Kv1.1, Kv1.2 and Kv1.3 channels.

Toxicity

Intracerebroventricular injection of HTX has been shown to cause neurotoxic symptoms in mice with an LD50 of 0.3 μg per 20 g body weight.

References

Ion channel toxins
Scorpion toxins